Assemblage 23 is an electronic act from the United States, currently based in Woonsocket, Rhode Island. It was founded in 1988 by Tom Shear who writes the music and lyrics and does the recording himself. Live performances are supported by Paul Seegers on keyboards and Mike Jenney on drums.

History

1980s–1990s (pre–Assemblage 23)
Prior to starting Assemblage 23, Shear experimented with music under the name Man on a Stage, beginning in the early 1980s. Most of Shear's music at this point was instrumental, as he lacked the confidence to sing; the quality of the music itself was highly questionable by his own admission. Shear eventually began to add vocals to his music; at the same time, Shear was also playing bass in a live band called the Advocates.

Assemblage 23 was officially born in 1988, after Shear experienced the industrial dance music played by an opening DJ for Depeche Mode. The style of this genre deeply impressed Shear; he believed he had finally found the sort of sound he wanted for his music. Even so, the project was more of a hobby for Shear at this point; it took until 1998 for Assemblage 23 to gather enough positive acclaim to attract the attention of record labels.

Late 1990s – early 2000
Shear signed a deal in 1999 with the Canadian label Gashed! for a full-length album (Contempt, released in November 1999). Contempt ranked #42 on the DAC Top Albums of 2000 chart in Germany. A second album, Failure, followed in March 2001 and was released by Gashed in North America and Accession Records in Europe. A single from Failure, "Disappoint", was released on Accession in October 2001 and ranked #42 on the DAC Top Singles chart for 2001. The song dealt with Shear's sense of loss after his father's suicide on October 28, 1999, and features a sample from the film In the Line of Fire.

After falling out with Gashed Records following Failure, Shear signed with US label Metropolis Records (US) later in 2001; Metropolis re-released Contempt and Failure in November.  A remix release, Addendum, was also released in November only on Accession. By this point, Assemblage 23 had become fairly popular within the EBM genre and closely catalogued alongside the "futurepop" genre, which Shear himself characterized — possibly tongue-in-cheek — as "mostly people who can't sing, over 90s-era trance patches."

The third album, Defiance, was released in October 2002 on Metropolis and Accession, preceded by the single "Document", in September of that year.

Assemblage 23 released a fourth album, Storm, in October 2004 with singles "Let the Wind Erase Me" in August and  "Ground" in November. "Ground" spent eight weeks on the DAC Singles chart peaking at #2.

Mid 2000 – present
In March 2007, Assemblage 23 released a new single, "Binary", which debuted at No. 21 on the Billboard US singles chart, preceding the album Meta, released in April 2007.

Also in 2007 saw the release of "Early Rare & Unreleased" which is a collection of 14 Assemblage 23 tracks taken from the years 1988–1998. In 2009, "Early Rare & Unreleased Volume Two" was released.

Assemblage 23 performed at Montreal's Kinetik Festival in May 2009. In September 2009, Assemblage 23 released the single "Spark," followed by its sixth studio album Compass.

On June 12, 2012, Assemblage 23 released the album "Bruise."

The album "Endure" was released on August 28, 2016, and, in October 2016, Assemblage 23 began a nationwide tour in support of the album.

The latest album, "Mourn", was released on September 11, 2020.

Band members
 Tom Shear - vocals, programming
 Paul Seegers - keyboards
 Mike Jenney - drums

Discography

Demo cassette
Demo, Fall 1998 – (CS demo) 1998 – no label

Studio albums
Contempt – (CD album) 1999 – Gashed! • (CD album) 2000 – Accession Records • (CD album) 2001 – Metropolis
Failure – (CD album) 2001 – Gashed!, Metropolis, Accession Records
Defiance – (CD album) 2002 – Metropolis, Accession Records • (CD album) 2005 – Irond
Storm – (CD album) 2004 – Metropolis, Accession Records • (CD) 2005 – Irond
Meta – (CD album) 2007 – Metropolis, Accession Records, Irond
Compass – (CD album) Oct. 2009 – Metropolis, Accession Records, Irond
Bruise – (CD album) June 2012 – Metropolis, Accession Records, Irond
Endure – (CD album) 2016 – Metropolis
Mourn - (CD album) 2020 - Metropolis

Remix albums, EPs
Addendum – (CD) 2001 – Accession Records

Early, Rare, and Unreleased collections
Early, Rare & Unreleased 1988–1998 – (CD, Ltd. Edition) 2007 – 23db
Early, Rare & Unreleased: Volume Two – (CD, Ltd. Edition) 2009 – 23db

Singles
"Disappoint" – (CD, Maxi) 2001 – Accession Records
"Document" – (CD Maxi) 2002 – Accession Records
"Let the Wind Erase Me" – (CD Maxi) 2004 – Metropolis, Accession Records
"Ground"– (CD Maxi) 2004 – Metropolis, Accession Records
"Binary" – (CD Maxi) 2007 – Metropolis, Accession Records
"Spark" – (CD Maxi) Sept. 2009 – Metropolis, Accession Records

See also
Nerve Filter, a side project by Shear.
Surveillance, a side project by Shear.
Helix, a side project by Shear and Mari Kattman.

References

External links

 Official Website
 Official MySpace
 Human.Not.Machine Official Forum
 Metropolis Records
 Accession Records
 Unofficial Releases, Remixes and Compilations

American industrial music groups
American synth-pop groups
American electronic body music groups
American musical trios
Electronic music groups from Rhode Island
Musical groups from Rhode Island
Musical groups from Seattle
Metropolis Records artists
Musical groups established in 1988